Heart's Desire is a 1935 British musical drama film directed by Paul L. Stein and starring Richard Tauber, Leonora Corbett, Kathleen Kelly, Diana Napier 
and Frank Vosper. Its plot involves a young opera singer who is discovered in Vienna and brought to London where he rises to stardom.
The film was made at Elstree Studios in April/May 1935, and had its charity premiere at the Regal Cinema, Marble Arch, London on 17 October that year. It was part of a cycle of British operetta films.

Cast
 Richard Tauber as Karl August Franz Ludwig Josef Steidler 
 Leonora Corbett as Frances Wilson 
 Carl Harbord as Oliver Desmond 
 Paul Graetz as Florian 
 Kathleen Kelly as Anna 
 George Graves as Granville Wilson 
 C. Denier Warren as Ted Mayer 
 Diana Napier as Diana Sheraton 
 Frank Vosper as Van Straaten 
 Viola Tree as Lady Bennington
 Hilda Campbell-Russell as Steidler's Maid

Critical reception
In a contemporary review, The Sydney Morning Herald wrote "This plot makes few demands upon Mr Tauber as actor and enables the audience to enjoy his magnificent singing without much interruption...It would be impossible one imagines, for Mr Tauber to navigate his way through a film that was stronger dramatically than this one. A film in which he appears becomes a pleasant alternative to a series of his phonograph records. From this point of view the producers of 'Heart's Desire' have succeeded admirably."

References

Bibliography
 Bock, Hans-Michael & Bergfelder, Tim. The Concise Cinegraph: Encyclopaedia of German Cinema. Berghahn Books, 2009.

External links

1935 films
1930s romantic musical films
1935 romantic drama films
British romantic drama films
British romantic musical films
Operetta films
Films directed by Paul L. Stein
Films shot at British International Pictures Studios
Films set in London
Films set in Vienna
British black-and-white films
1930s English-language films
1930s British films